Pleasanton is a city in Atascosa County, Texas, United States. The population was 8,934 at the 2010 census. Pleasanton's official motto is "The City of Live Oaks and Friendly Folks." It is part of the San Antonio-New Braunfels Metropolitan Statistical Area.

Pleasanton honors its cowboy heritage with the "Mr. Cowboy" sculpture in front of City Hall and across from the giant oak tree downtown. The roots of the cattle kingdom can be traced to Atascosa County in the 1860s, which calls itself "the birthplace of the cowboys." The sculpture is a gift from Ben and Mona Parker. The Longhorn Museum in east Pleasanton on Highway 97 contains artifacts and memorabilia of the cowboy years. The Cowboy Homecoming, begun in 1966, is an annual event held at the Atascosa River Park in Pleasanton.

History
Pleasanton was established in 1858 when conflicts with the Native Americans caused the settlers to move the location of the county seat from Amphion. The settlers chose the current townsite because of its location at the mouth of Bonita Creek. John Bowen (died 1867), San Antonio's first Anglo-American postmaster, founded and named the town of Pleasanton after his good friend and fellow early Texas Settler John Pleasants.

At one time Pleasanton had two newspapers, the Pleasanton Picayune, which became the Pleasanton Express in 1909, and the Pleasanton Reporter. The county seat was relocated from Pleasanton to Jourdanton in 1910. Pleasanton was incorporated in 1917.

In November 1957, the citizens of Pleasanton voted overwhelmingly to desegregate the public schools. This came some two months after the crisis at Little Rock Central High School in Arkansas. Some three dozen African American pupils were then integrated into the Pleasanton school.

Geography and climate

Most soils of Pleasanton are quite sandy at the surface but have a clay-rich subsoil that holds moisture. They belong to the Alfisol soil order. Common soil series in town are Nusil, Poth and Rhymes.

Climate

According to the Köppen Climate Classification system, Pleasanton has a humid subtropical climate, abbreviated "Cfa" on climate maps.

Demographics

2020 census

As of the 2020 United States census, there were 10,648 people, 3,462 households, and 2,558 families residing in the city.

2000 census
As of the census of 2000, there were 8,266 people, 2,941 households, and 2,135 families residing in the city. The population density was 1,293.5 people per square mile (499.5/km). There were 3,212 housing units at an average density of 502.6 per square mile (194.1/km). The racial makeup of the city was 79.13% White, 0.98% African American, 0.97% Native American, 0.50% Asian, 0.17% Pacific Islander, 15.34% from other races, and 2.92% from two or more races. Hispanic or Latino of any race were 51.15% of the population.

There were 2,941 households, out of which 39.0% had children under the age of 18 living with them, 52.8% were married couples living together, 15.0% had a female householder with no husband present, and 27.4% were non-families. 23.7% of all households were made up of individuals, and 11.7% had someone living alone who was 65 years of age or older. The average household size was 2.77 and the average family size was 3.28.

In the city, the population was spread out, with 30.4% under the age of 18, 9.0% from 18 to 24, 27.1% from 25 to 44, 19.9% from 45 to 64, and 13.6% who were 65 years of age or older. The median age was 33 years. For every 100 females, there were 90.7 males. For every 100 females age 18 and over, there were 87.2 males.

The median income for a household in the city was $29,644, and the median income for a family was $34,718. Males had a median income of $28,849 versus $20,144 for females. The per capita income for the city was $14,878. About 16.8% of families and 22.2% of the population were below the poverty line, including 30.9% of those under age 18 and 21.8% of those aged 65 or over.

Culture
Pleasanton in steeped in Texas cattle and ranch culture, with numerous working ranches nearby.

Part of the film The Sugarland Express was filmed around the intersection of 2nd Street and Commerce Street. Every year, Pleasanton hosts the "Cowboy Homecoming Festival", which commemorates the time when the cowboys driving cattle from South Texas to the railheads up north would return home.  This event takes place each October.

Education
Almost all of Pleasanton is located within the Pleasanton Independent School District and home to the Pleasanton High School Eagles.  In the school year, 2010–2011 Pleasanton I.S.D. received Academically Unacceptable ratings from the Texas Education Agency for their high school campus and their school of choice.  The school district received an Acceptable rating for their junior high and Exceptional for the elementary and primary campuses.  Pleasanton I.S.D. has seen several families move their students to Jourdanton I.S.D. and McMullen County I.S.D. due to the poor ratings of the high school campus.

A small portion of the town is in the Jourdanton Independent School District.

Coastal Bend College of Beeville maintains a branch two-year campus in Pleasanton.

Notable people

 Willie Nelson, was a radio DJ in Pleasanton at one time
 Pete Flores, Texas State Senator, 19th district

Gallery

References

External links

 City of Pleasanton official website
 The Pleasanton Express, local newspaper
 Handbook of Texas Online article

Cities in Atascosa County, Texas
Cities in Texas
Greater San Antonio
Populated places established in 1858
1858 establishments in Texas